Baqerabad (also Romanized as Bāqerābād; also known as Bāqelābād and Baqlābād) is a village in Hoseynabad-e Shomali Rural District, Saral District, Divandarreh County, Kurdistan Province, Iran. At the 2006 census, its population was 793, in 180 families. The village is populated by Kurds.

References 

Towns and villages in Divandarreh County
Kurdish settlements in Kurdistan Province